Smith & Carrier was an architectural partnership based in Asheville, North Carolina.  It was formed in 1906 as a partnership of Richard Sharp Smith (1852–1924) and Albert Heath Carrier (1878–1961).

The firm lasted until the death of Smith in 1924 and created more than 700 works.  After Smith's death, Carrier completed some open commissions but did not do much more.  A number of the firm's works are listed on the U.S. National Register of Historic Places.

Works include:
William Jennings Bryan House, 107 Evelyn Pl., Asheville, North Carolina (Smith & Carrier), NRHP-listed 
Jackson County Courthouse, Main St., Sylva, North Carolina (Smith & Carrier), NRHP-listed
Madison County Courthouse, Main St., Marshall, North Carolina (Smith & Carrier), NRHP-listed
One or more works in Marshall Main Street Historic District, 101 N. Main St.- 165 S. Main St., Bridge St. and 33 Bailey's Branch Rd., Marshall, North Carolina (Smith & Carrier), NRHP-listed
Intheoaks (entrance gates), 1922, NRHP-listed

References

Architecture firms based in North Carolina
Defunct architecture firms of the United States
Companies based in Asheville, North Carolina
Design companies established in 1909
Design companies disestablished in 1924
1909 establishments in North Carolina
1924 disestablishments in North Carolina
Defunct companies based in North Carolina